Oakland is an unincorporated community in Laclede County, in the Ozarks of southern Missouri. The community is located on Route B, two miles south of the junction of Route B with Missouri Route 32. The site lies five miles southeast of Lebanon.

History
A post office called Oakland was established in 1849, and remained in operation until 1955. The community was named for a grove of oak trees near the original town site.

References

Unincorporated communities in Laclede County, Missouri
Unincorporated communities in Missouri